The rivalry between Molde and Rosenborg is a notable one in Norwegian football as both clubs are recognised for having great history and traditions.

The rivalry had increased importance in the 1990s, as Rosenborg enjoyed the most successful period in the history of the club and Molde developed their team to become Rosenborgs biggest challenger for many seasons. From 1992 to 2004, Rosenborg became champions of Eliteserien thirteen times in succession. In the same period of time Molde won the Norwegian Cup in 1994 and finished second in the league four times (1995, 1998, 1999, 2002). 

The status of the rivalry increased during the 90s due to numerous fights for the title. On 8 September 1990, Rosenborg won 7–1 away which, as of 2022, still is the biggest winning margin. The teams met in the semi-final of the 1994 Norwegian Cup. Molde won 2–1 at home and drew 2–2 in Trondheim, and with a 4–3 win on aggregate, Molde qualified for their third cup final. After having lost on aggregate, Rosenborg head coach Nils Arne Eggen called Molde's playing style for "arse-football" ("rævvafotball"). The term has later become a common way to describe football perceived as defensive or boring to watch.

In 2022, Molde won the league with four games to spare. Before the following game against Rosenborg, Rosenborg stated in a press release that they would refuse to stand guard of honour for the champions as they claimed Molde would use it to humiliate them.

Honours
  Numbers with this background and symbol are italicised to denote club holds record in the competition.

 (*) = Shared with Odds BK.

Results

Head-to-head

All-time results

Molde in the league at home

Rosenborg in the league at home

Results in domestic cup matches

Records and statistics
First competitive meeting: Rosenborg 4–1 Molde, Norwegian Cup third round, 25 June 1967
First league meeting: Rosenborg 2–1 Molde, 1. divisjon, 15 May 1974
First Norwegian Cup meeting: Rosenborg 4–1 Molde, third round, 25 June 1967
First away victory for Molde: 5–2 vs Rosenborg, 1. divisjon, 16 June 1980
First away victory for Rosenborg: 1–0 vs Molde, Norwegian Cup, 15 August 1971
Highest scoring game: Rosenborg 7–2 Molde, Norwegian Cup, 22 August 1984
Largest winning margin (Rosenborg): 6 goals – 7–1 vs Molde, 1. divisjon, 8 September 1990
Largest winning margin (Molde): 5 goals – 5–0 vs Rosenborg, Norwegian Cup quarter-final, 9 August 2009
Most consecutive wins (Rosenborg): 5, joint record:
4 October 1995 – 19 October 1997
27 September 2009 – 7 August 2011
28 May 2016 – 8 April 2018
Most consecutive wins (Molde): 4, 26 October 2013 – 27 July 2014
Longest undefeated run (Molde): 8 – 6 wins and 2 draws over 28 October 2012 to 20 September 2015
Longest undefeated run (Rosenborg): 7 – 6 wins and 1 draw over 12 July 2000 to 5 October 2003
Most consecutive draws: 2, 10 September 1994 – 2 July 1995
Most games played against each other in a season: 3, in the 1984, 1988, 2009, 2012 and 2013 seasons

Doubles
Rosenborg have achieved the double in thirteen seasons (most recently in the 2017 season), while Molde have managed to win both league matches twice, in 2014 and 2021.

Rosenborg doubles

Molde doubles

Most appearances

1Roar Strand played 29 games for Rosenborg and two games for Molde

Players who have represented both clubs
The following footballers have played for both Molde and Rosenborg:

Head-to-head ranking in Eliteserien

• Total: Rosenborg 44 times higher, Molde 11 times higher.

Source:

References

Specific

Molde FK
Rosenborg
Football rivalries in Norway